Cyprien Sarrazin (born 13 October 1994) is a French World Cup alpine ski racer and competes primarily in giant slalom.

Born in Gap, Hautes-Alpes, Sarrazin made his World Cup debut at age 21 in February 2016. In only his seventh World Cup race, he won the parallel giant slalom in Alta Badia, Italy, against a field that included perennial giant slalom stalwarts Marcel Hirscher and Alexis Pinturault.

World Cup results

Season standings

Race podiums
 1 win – (1 PGS)
 2 podiums – (1 GS, 1 PG)

References

External links

 
 Cyprien Sarrazin World Cup standings at the International Ski Federation
 
 French Ski Team – 2020 men's A team 

1994 births
French male alpine skiers
Living people
People from Gap, Hautes-Alpes
Alpine skiers at the 2022 Winter Olympics
Olympic alpine skiers of France
Sportspeople from Hautes-Alpes